Delree Dumont is a Cree artist whose family is from Onion Lake Cree Nation.

Early life and education 
Dumont was born in Chilliwack, British Columbia and is a member of Onion Lake Cree Nation in Saskatchewan. Prior to working as a full-time artist in 2014 Dumont was employed in Alberta's oil and gas industry.  She currently works out of her home

Career

Style 
Dumont's early work was in the realist style. Her more recent painting is primarily in the style of pointillism. Her primary medium is acrylic, but some of her works also include oil and watercolor work. Much of her artistic work draws on her experience as an Indigenous person.

Reception 
In 2018 Dumont was invited to be part of an Indigenous Tourism Association of Canada event to be held at the Canadian embassy in Germany. As part of this invitation Dumont painted live in front of an audience at the embassy.

Work

Exhibited Work 
 "Waiting For Grant Entry", Imago Mundi: Great and North Canadian Exhibit, Palazzo Lorendan (Venice, Italy), 2017.

Awards and nominations 
In 2017 Dumont won the Didsbury Business of the Year award. In the same year she also received a grant from the Indigenous Tourism Association to support her artistic work. In 2017 Dumont's business also won bronze in the Mountain View Gazette's Readers' Choice Award.

References 

Created via preloaddraft
Living people
First Nations artists
Year of birth missing (living people)
Artists from Alberta
Canadian women painters
Cree people
First Nations women artists